Mount Usher is a distinctive mountain overlooking the south side of Keltie Glacier about  southwest of the mouth of Brandau Glacier in Antarctica. Discovered and named by the British Antarctic Expedition (1907–09). Identification of this feature varied on subsequent maps. The present description follows the H.E. Saunders map of 1961 which has now been generally accepted.

Further reading 
 Damien Gildea, Mountaineering in Antarctica: complete guide: Travel guide

References

Mountains of the Ross Dependency
Dufek Coast